The 2019 NorCA Women's Handball Championship was the third edition of the Nor.Ca. Women's Handball Championship. The tournament took place in Mexico City from 28 May to 2 June 2019. It acted as the North American and Caribbean qualifying tournament for the 2019 World Women's Handball Championship.

Draw
The draw took place on 14 April 2019.

Seeding

Preliminary round
All times are local (UTC−6).

Group A

Group B

Knockout stage

Bracket

Placement matches

Semifinals

Third place game

Final

Final standing

References

External links
Results at todor66

Nor.Ca. Women's Handball Championship
Nor.Ca Women's Handball Championship
2019 in Mexican sports
International handball competitions hosted by Mexico
Sports competitions in Mexico City
Nor.Ca. Women's Handball
Nor.Ca. Women's Handball